The 2010 Asian Women's Hockey Champions Trophy was the inaugural edition of the Women's Asian Champions Trophy. The tournament was held in Busan, South Korea. The top four Asian teams (China, India, Japan, and South Korea) participated in the tournament which involved round-robin league among all teams followed by play-offs for final positions.

Umpires
Six umpires were selected to officiate at the tournament:

Nirmla Dagar (IND)
Nor Piza Hassan (MAS)
Kang Hyun-hee (KOR)
Kim Jung-hee (KOR)
Liu Lijie (CHN)
Kitty Yau (HKG)

Results
All times are South Korea Standard Time (UTC+8)

Round robin

Classification round

Third place game

Final

Final standings

References

Women's Asian Champions Trophy
Asian Champions Trophy
Asian Champions Trophy
International women's field hockey competitions hosted by South Korea
Asian Champions Trophy
Sport in Busan